Andrew Wallace Williamson KCVO, (29 December 1856 – 10 July 1926) was a Church of Scotland minister who was Dean of the Thistle. He was Moderator of the General Assembly in 1913.

Life
He was born in Thornhill in Dumfriesshire on 29 December 1856, the youngest son of James Williamson and his wife Margaret Wallace.

He was educated at Morton School and Wallace Hall Academy then studied Divinity at the University of Edinburgh graduating MA in 1878. He was licensed to preach as a Church of Scotland minister by the Presbytery of Edinburgh in 1881.

Beginning as an assistant at North Leith Parish Church on Madeira Street in north Edinburgh, he was ordained as full minister there in 1882. He was then translated to St Cuthbert's Church in central Edinburgh in 1883. This was as the collegiate minister alongside Rev James MacGregor in first charge. During this time he was also a lecturer in pastoral theology at his alma mater. He received the honorary degree Doctor of Divinity (DD) from the University of St Andrews in 1900. In January 1910 he was appointed first minister at St Giles' Cathedral and the following year Dean of the Thistle and Dean of the Chapel Royal. In 1913 he was elected Moderator of the General Assembly of the Church of Scotland, the highest position in the Scottish church.

Williamson was largely responsible for co-ordinating the huge rebuilding project at St Cuthbert's by architect Hippolyte Blanc in 1892-4. This was partially funded by his predecessor Rev James Veitch. As a somewhat immodest part of the rebuilding he included a plaque to himself  on the outer west face and to Rev James MacGregor the first charge minister balancing his memorial on the opposite side of the tower.

He lived at 44 Palmerston Place in Edinburgh's fashionable West End.

An Honorary Chaplain to the King, he died on 10 July 1926 and is buried on the central path of the northern extension to Dean Cemetery in western Edinburgh. His position at St Cuthberts was filled by William Lyall Wilson.

His biography was written by Lord Sands.

His more noteworthy roles included conducting the funeral of Sir Hector MacDonald and being on the committee for the design and building of the Scottish National War Memorial.

Family

He first married (1883) Agnes Blackstock daughter of Walter Blackstock. They had no children and she died in 1885.

He secondly married (1888) Elizabeth Mary Phoebe Croall (1860–1946), daughter of Robert Croall of Craigcrook Castle. They had two daughters and a son:

Agnes Honor Margaret Williamson (1889-1892), died in infancy
Robert Howard Wallace Williamson (1892-1962), buried in Warriston Cemetery
Verona Maud Williamson (1896-1980), buried in Dean Cemetery

Publications

The Methodist Church (1884)
The Place and Power of Woman (1892)
Social Unrest (1895)
Ideals of Ministry (1901)
Dr John MacLeod: His Work and Teraching (1901)
A Farewell Message of St Paul
Ambassadors for Christ (1910)

References

1856 births
People from Thornhill, Dumfries and Galloway
People educated at Wallace Hall Academy
Alumni of the University of Edinburgh
20th-century Ministers of the Church of Scotland
Academics of the University of Edinburgh
Deans of the Chapel Royal in Scotland
Deans of the Thistle
Knights Commander of the Royal Victorian Order
Honorary Chaplains to the King
Moderators of the General Assembly of the Church of Scotland
1926 deaths
Burials at the Dean Cemetery
Ministers of St Giles' Cathedral
19th-century Ministers of the Church of Scotland